Đorđe Vojnović (born 8 April 1971) is a retired Macedonian basketball player who played for MZT Skopje Aerodrom and Rabotnički.

Personal life
He is the General manager of Triglav Osiguruvanje in Macedonia.

References

External links
 
 
 

1971 births
Living people
KK MZT Skopje players
KK Rabotnički players
Macedonian men's basketball players
Macedonian people of Serbian descent
Sportspeople from Skopje
Small forwards
Shooting guards